Guma is a Local Government Area of Benue State, North Central Nigeria. Its headquarters are in the town of Gbajimba.
 
It has an area of 2,882 km and a population of 191,599 at the 2006 census.

The postal code of the area is 970.

The newly elected governor of Benue State in the April 11th, 2015 governorship election, Chief Dr. Samuel Ortom hails from Guma.

References

Local Government Areas in Benue State